Jaroslav Pitner (26 February 1926–2009) was a Czech ice hockey coach nicknamed the "General of Ice Hockey".

Pitner led the Czechoslovakian national team to key victories over the Soviet team in 1969, a year after the Soviet Union led Warsaw Pact invasion of Czechoslovakia. Under his leadership, the team also won the world title in 1972, as well as a silver medal at the 1968 Winter Olympics and a bronze at the 1972 games.

References 

2009 deaths
Czech ice hockey coaches
Czechoslovak ice hockey coaches
Czechoslovakia men's national ice hockey team coaches
1926 births
Czechoslovak expatriate ice hockey people
Czechoslovak expatriate sportspeople in West Germany
People from Mělník District
Sportspeople from the Central Bohemian Region